Colin Corbishley (13 June 1939 – 28 May 2015) was an English footballer who played as a midfielder for Port Vale, Chester, Stafford Rangers, and Prescot Town.

Career
Corbishley joined Port Vale as an amateur in June 1959 and signed as a professional in October of that year. He made his debut on 17 October 1960, in a League Cup 2–2 draw with Queens Park Rangers at Loftus Road. He played a further two League Cup and three Third Division matches that season. Used as a rotation player by manager Norman Low, he featured only in eight of the last nine games of the 1961–62 season before being released from Vale Park in May 1962. He moved on to Bill Lambton's Chester, and scored 11 goals in 83 Fourth Division games as the "Seals" finished in the re-election zone in 1962–63 before rising to 12th and eighth place in 1963–64 and 1964–65 under new manager Peter Hauser. After leaving Sealand Road, Corbishley played for Stafford Rangers and Prescot Town.

Career statistics
Source:

References

1939 births
2015 deaths
Footballers from Stoke-on-Trent
English footballers
Association football midfielders
Port Vale F.C. players
Chester City F.C. players
Stafford Rangers F.C. players
Prescot Cables F.C. players
English Football League players